was a Japanese politician.

Biography
Aikawa was born in Urawa, Saitama. A graduate of Keio University, he was elected mayor of Urawa in 1991 and served for ten years. On 27 May 2001, he was chosen as the first mayor of the city of Saitama, which was founded on 1 May 2001 through the merger of Urawa and two neighboring cities. He governed Saitama for eight years until he lost to Hayato Shimizu in the mayoral election held in May 2009.

He died of respiratory failure.

References 
 
  

Mayors of places in Saitama Prefecture
1942 births
2021 deaths
People from Saitama (city)
Keio University alumni
Deaths from respiratory failure